The Principality of Bethio (also spelled Bequio, Bekio, Bitio, Bétio or Beetyo) was a small monarchy located for centuries along the lower Senegal River valley, on the border between modern Mauritania and Senegal, in the northeast of Biffeche.  In the 18th century it was also called the "Royaume d'Oral"Boobihbincreess.lkkok.  Its capital was at Poum, then moved to N'Dombo, and finally moved to Ross, Senegal in the 19th century (called Ross Béthio since then).  The original, fertile farmlands of Bethio are in a region just east of the Djoudj National Bird Sanctuary.

In the 1720s, the Brak (king) of Oualo (Waalo) was Erim M'Bagnick (Yérim Mbañik) and Béquio Malicouri king of the Royaume d'Oral was his vassal.  The latter appears to have been succeeded by Fara Coro.

In the 18th century the most famous "Prince Bethio" was Maalixuri (Malichouri) (Malikhuri Diop ) who was legendary for his cleverness, changes of strategy, and defiance in disputes with the Kingdom of Waalo and with the French at Saint-Louis, Senegal.

Today, Abdoulaye Diop, the current Prince Bethio, lives at Ross-Bethio where he is a  Senegalese political leader.

Notes

The name also appears as Béco and appears synonymous with the Island of Becos in the river delta.  It has been suggested that this is the island nowadays known as Baba Gueye.

References

Barry, Boubacar. Le royaume du Waalo - Le Senegal avant la conquete. Karthala, 1985.
V. Monteil. Esquisses sénégalaises. Dakar, IFAN, 1966, p. 34-35

External links
 Indigenous chief Béquio Malicouri
Béco reference
Area Map
Abdoulaye Diop

Former monarchies
Geography of Senegal
History of Senegal
Kingdoms of Senegal
French West Africa